Margaret Ellen (Maggie) Fox (born February 4, 1960) was a 14-year-old American girl who vanished under suspicious circumstances in Burlington, New Jersey, in 1974.

Disappearance
On June 24, 1974, Margaret Ellen Fox had plans to meet with a man who called himself "John Marshall" in regards to a babysitting job. Marshall had responded to an advertisement she had placed for her services and stated he needed a babysitter the following weekend, but postponed the first several meetings with her. He finally said that he would meet her in a red Volkswagen. Fox took a bus to get to Mount Holly. Her younger sister accompanied her to the bus stop and saw her board the bus. Witnesses reported seeing Fox near Mill and High streets after she reached Mount Holly. She has not been seen since.

Ransom call
In the hours after Fox was reported missing, authorities started to record all phone calls that went to and from the Fox residence. One of these phone calls was from a man who demanded a $10,000 ransom for her safe return. The man stated to Margaret's mother, who took the telephone call, "10,000 might be a lot of bread, but your daughter's life is the buttered topping." The caller has never been identified. Efforts have been made in recent years to identify this man whom police and the Federal Bureau of Investigation (FBI) believe to be Fox's abductor.

Investigation
After Fox failed to return home, her family notified authorities of her disappearance. Upon investigation, authorities discovered that "John Marshall" gave Fox a phone number prior to her disappearance. The number was later traced to a phone booth at a supermarket in Lumberton. Authorities immediately knew that the circumstances surrounding Fox's disappearance were suspicious in nature, believing that the girl became the victim of an abduction. Several other parents complained of men trying to lure their daughters with fake job offers. In 1976, a suspect in her case confessed to involvement in her disappearance but it turned out to be false. Marshall has never been identified.

2019 updates

The Burlington City Police Department and the FBI have reevaluated their efforts to find Fox and her abductor. The audio recording of the ransom call has been uploaded to the FBI website in an effort to see if someone might recognize the voice of the man who claimed he had Fox and wanted $10,000 for her safe return. In 2017, a retired police officer entered into a partnership with the Burlington PD to review and hopefully solve the case. A $25,000 reward is being offered for information leading to the arrests of Fox's abductor(s). There have been no arrests made since.

Unidentified persons exclusions
According to the National Missing and Unidentified Persons System, the following decedents were ruled out as being the remains of Fox.

See also
List of kidnappings
List of people who disappeared

Notes

References

External links
Margaret Ellen Fox at the Federal Bureau of Investigation

Margaret Ellen Fox at the Charley Project

1970s missing person cases
1974 crimes in the United States
1974 in New Jersey
June 1974 events in the United States
Kidnapped American children
Missing American children
Kidnappings in the United States
Missing person cases in New Jersey
Burlington, New Jersey
Incidents of violence against girls